KTU (pronounced K2) is a Finnish-American progressive/experimental musical supergroup. In 2004, Trey Gunn and Pat Mastelotto started collaborating with Kimmo Pohjonen and Samuli Kosminen, forming KTU out of their respective duos TU and Kluster.

History
Kimmo and Samuli formed Kluster in 2001. Both award-winning musicians are known as adventurers in their respective fields and their partnership takes accordion music to new and unexplored territory. On stage, Kosminen reproduces samples of Pohjonen's accordion and voice percussively by way of electronic drum pads. Samuli also drums with Icelandic band Múm, and other recent Kluster collaborations include the project Uniko, together with Kronos Quartet.

Percussionist Pat Mastelotto and touch guitarist Trey Gunn have enjoyed successful careers with the band King Crimson. The two met at Peter Gabriel's Real World Studios before touring with David Sylvian & Robert Fripp. As the duo TU, they have released one studio album.

Seeds for KTU took root at SXSW in Austin, Texas in March 1999, when Pohjonen shared a billing with Mastelotto/Gunn/Robert Fripp's ProjeKcts Three at the Electric Lounge. Plans for the quartet took shape over the next five years.

KTU rehearsals and the World Premiere concert took place in Helsinki at the Nosturi club in April 2004, followed by four concerts in Tokyo; recordings from these shows comprise the debut record 8 Armed Monkey, released in 2005. Live concerts continued in 2005 with headlining festival appearances in Germany at the Moers Festival, Kulturzelt, Kulturarena, as well as FMM Sines in Portugal. In 2007, KTU debuted their live show in the US and Mexico as a trio (minus Kosminen, who continues to contribute to the band on occasion).

The group's second album, Quiver, was released in March 2009.

Band members
Current members
 Trey Gunn (Warr guitar)
 Pat Mastelotto (rhythmic devices, beats, noises, percussion)
 Kimmo Pohjonen (Chromatic button accordion, voice)

Former members
 Samuli Kosminen (samples)

Discography
 8 Armed Monkey (2005)
 Quiver (2009)

References

External links
 KTU on Kimmo Pohjonen official website

Musical groups established in 2004
American progressive rock groups